Susan Ellyn Goff is an American prelate of the Episcopal Church. She was elected and consecrated as Suffragan Bishop of Virginia in 2012. She became Ecclesiastical Authority of the diocese in 2018 upon the retirement of Shannon Johnston, thirteenth bishop of the diocese. She will retire at the end of 2022.

Early life and education
Goff was educated at Douglass College, then a woman's liberal arts college in New Brunswick, New Jersey. She trained for ordination at the Union Theological Seminary in New York City, and achieved a distinction in her Master of Divinity (M.Div.) degree.

Ordained ministry
Goff was ordained in 1980. She has spent all of her ordained ministry in the Episcopal Diocese of Virginia.

On July 28, 2012, Goff was consecrated a bishop during a service at S. Paul's Episcopal Church in Richmond, Virginia. The chief consecrator was Katharine Jefferts Schori (the Presiding Bishop of the Episcopal Church), and the co-consecrators included Shannon S. Johnston (then Bishop of Virginia).

See also
 List of Episcopal bishops of the United States
 Historical list of the Episcopal bishops of the United States

References

Living people
Women Anglican bishops
Douglass College alumni
Union Theological Seminary (New York City) alumni
Year of birth missing (living people)
21st-century Anglican bishops in the United States
Episcopal bishops of Virginia